The 2022 Wartburg Knights football team represented Wartburg College of as a member of the American Rivers Conference (ARC) during the 2022 NCAA Division III football season. Led by second-year head coach Chris Winter, the Knights compiled an overall record of 13–1 with a mark of 8–0 in conference play, winning the ARC title and earning an automatic bid to the NCAA Division III Football Championship playoffs. There, the Knights made it to their first ever national semifinal, losing to the eventual national runner up, Mount Union. The team played home games at Walston-Hoover Stadium in Waverly, Iowa.

Schedule
Wartburg's 2022 regular season scheduled consisted of five home and five away games.

References

Wartburg
Wartburg Knights football seasons
Wartburg Knights football